Percy Bernard may refer to:

Percy Bernard, 5th Earl of Bandon (1904–1979), Royal Air Force air marshal
Percy Bernard (MP) (1844–1912), British politician